Comtel may refer to:

 Comtel Air, a former Austrian airline 
 COMTEL Project, an African telecom project
 Comtel, a former UK Cable TV company, see Telecential